Yosvel Iglesias (born 31 January 1982) is a Cuban rower. He competed in the men's lightweight double sculls event at the 2004 Summer Olympics.

References

External links
 

1982 births
Living people
Cuban male rowers
Olympic rowers of Cuba
Rowers at the 2004 Summer Olympics
People from Pinar del Río
Pan American Games medalists in rowing
Pan American Games gold medalists for Cuba
Rowers at the 2003 Pan American Games
20th-century Cuban people
21st-century Cuban people